Nathan Pasha (born July 15, 1992) is an American tennis player.

Pasha has a career high ATP singles ranking of 507 achieved on January 7, 2019. He also has a career high ATP doubles ranking of 119 achieved on December 3, 2018.

Pasha made his ATP main draw debut at the 2010 US Open in the doubles draw partnering Sekou Bangoura. Pasha also played college tennis at the University of Georgia.

Challenger and Futures finals

Singles: 1 (0–1)

Doubles: 24 (8–16)

References

External links
 
 
 

1992 births
Living people
American male tennis players
Tennis players from Atlanta
Georgia Bulldogs tennis players